Henry Allan may refer to:

Henry William Allan (1843–1913), Canadian politician, merchant and produce dealer
Henry Allan (painter) (1865–1912), Irish painter
Henry Allan (footballer) (1872–1965), Scottish footballer
Henry Allan (cricketer) (1846–1926), Australian cricketer
Henry William Allan (rugby union) (1850–1926), Scottish rugby player

See also
Henry Allen (disambiguation)
Harry Allan (disambiguation)
Harry Allen (disambiguation)
Harold Allen (disambiguation)